Vermont Route F-5 (VT F-5) is a town-maintained state highway located in Chittenden County, Vermont, in the United States. The route, assigned in the late 1920s, is the last remaining F-X designation in Vermont. F-X route designations were previously used for roads leading to ferries across Lake Champlain.  VT F-5's western terminus is at the Charlotte–Essex Ferry traversing Lake Champlain, which links VT F-5 with New York State Route 22 (NY 22) on the opposite side of the lake. The eastern terminus is at an intersection with U.S. Route 7 (US 7) in Charlotte. It is known as Ferry Road for its entire length.

Route description

From the Charlotte–Essex Ferry dock on the east bank of Lake Champlain in Charlotte, VT F-5 curves to the east for a short time before turning to the north. After a half-mile, Ferry Road and VT F-5 turn for the final time, making an eastward turn onto a straightway that leads to US 7.

Despite the lack of curves on the  straightaway, the hilly terrain of the area makes navigating the road a challenge at times.

History
VT F-5 was assigned in the late 1920s as part of a series of 11 F-X routes connecting ferries across Lake Champlain from New York to the remainder of the Vermont state highway system. The routes were numbered from VT F-1 to VT F-10 (with one suffixed route, VT F-9A) and assigned in order from north to south, with VT F-1 connecting to the northernmost ferry between the two states. A 12th route, VT F-10A, was added ca. 1930, but merged with VT F-9 by the following year.

Over the next three decades, many of the F-X routes were eliminated or renumbered to standard numerical designations as all but four Lake Champlain ferries ceased operations. By the early 1960s, only two F-X routes remained: VT F-5 and VT F-3, a loop route on Grand Isle serving the Grand Isle–Plattsburgh Ferry. VT F-3 was renumbered to VT 314 ca. 1964, leaving VT F-5 as the last F-X route.

Major intersections

References

External links 

F-5
Transportation in Chittenden County, Vermont